The Kondyor  Massif or Konder is a circular intrusion of igneous rock, about  in diameter. It is reached from Yakutsk by road via Amga. It is an important source of platinum.

Since 1984, Artel Starateley "Amur" (part of the Russian Platinum group) has developed this alluvial platinum deposit.

See also
Ring dike

References

External links 

Landforms of the Russian Far East
Mountain ranges of Khabarovsk Krai
Igneous intrusions
Geology of Russia
Platinum